Lucida is a genus of skippers in the family Hesperiidae.

Species
Recognised species in the genus Lucida include:
 Lucida leopardus Weeks,  1901
 Lucida lucia (Capronnier, 1874)
 Lucida melitaea (Draudt, 1923)
 Lucida oebasus (Godman,  1900)
 Lucida scopas (Mabille,  1891)

References

Natural History Museum Lepidoptera genus database

Hesperiinae
Hesperiidae genera